Baghali polow is an Iranian dish of rice, fava beans and dill. In Persian, baghali means fava bean while polo is pilaf, a style of cooked rice. It is made by cooking rice and green broad beans in boiling water. When cooked, the rice and beans are layered with dill in a pan, and everything is baked in an oven until ready. Saffron water can also be added to the rice. It is typically served with meat. Like other Iranian traditional foods, the dish may be served at special occasions and family gatherings.

Similar dishes are found throughout the Middle East and Caucasus. In Iraq the dish is called timman bagilla, using the Iraqi dialect term for rice timman.  In Azerbaijani it's called şüyüd plov, translating literally as "dill rice", or paxla plov in reference to the fava beans.

When the rice is mostly cooked but before it has fully steamed, the pan may be lined with fresh unleavened egg dough to create a crispy bottom crust called kazmag in Azerbaijani, similar to the Iranian tahdig.

See also
 Culture of Iran
 Culture of Azerbaijan
 Iranian cuisine
 Azerbaijani cuisine
 Khoresht
 List of rice dishes
 Polow (pilaf, polo, pelau)

References

Rice dishes
Iranian cuisine
Azerbaijani cuisine
Persian words and phrases